Walter Zenga  (born 28 April 1960) is an Italian football manager and former player who last managed Serie A club Cagliari. He was a long-time goalkeeper for Inter Milan and the Italy national team.

During his playing career, Zenga was part of the Italian squad that finished fourth at the 1984 Olympics in Los Angeles and was the starting goalkeeper for the Italian team that finished third in the 1990 FIFA World Cup tournament held in Italy, keeping a World Cup record unbeaten streak. A three-time winner of the IFFHS World's Best Goalkeeper Award, Zenga is regarded by pundits as one of the best goalkeepers of all time, and in 2013 was voted the eighth best goalkeeper of the past quarter-century by IFFHS. In 2000, he also placed 20th in the World Keeper of the Century Elections by the same organisation.

After retiring as a player, Zenga briefly became an actor in an Italian soap opera and also a pundit on Italian TV. Since 1998 he has worked as a head coach and managed clubs in the United States, Italy, Turkey, Romania, Serbia, Saudi Arabia, the United Arab Emirates and England.

Club career
Zenga joined Inter Milan in 1982, after starting his professional career in 1978 in the lower divisions of Italian football (his first team was Salernitana in Serie C1, and he also played for Savona and Sambenedettese). Initially (in the 1982–83 season) he was the substitute of Ivano Bordon, who was one of the top Italian goalkeepers of his era, as he had been Dino Zoff's reserve in the 1982 FIFA World Cup. However, Zenga played Inter's matches in the Coppa Italia, impressing enough that the club decided not to buy another goalkeeper after Bordon's decision to move to Sampdoria during the summer of 1983. Zenga became Inter's starting goalkeeper in the 1983–84 season, where he conceded only 23 goals, better than any other goalkeeper in that season.

The next season would prove to be bittersweet for Zenga: although he continued to play excellently, he did not manage to win any trophies. In Italy, Inter was the main rival of Hellas Verona who won the first and, to this day, only Scudetto of its history in 1985, while in Europe he had to suffer two bitter and quite controversial defeats at the hands of Spanish giants Real Madrid, both times in the UEFA Cup semi-finals. However, personal success was growing: he became a fan favourite due to his qualities and his love for the team, his fame was now nationwide thanks to his larger than life personality and he quickly established himself as one of the premier goalkeepers of the country, which led to him being called up to Italy's squad for the 1986 World Cup.

Apart from enjoying the selection for a World Cup, the summer of 1986 proved to be important for Zenga also at club level. In fact, Inter signed Giovanni Trapattoni, who left Juventus after a highly successful 10-year stint, to manage the team. Meanwhile, the trio formed by Zenga, Giuseppe Bergomi and Riccardo Ferri (who respectively occupied the positions of goalkeeper, right-sided full-back, and man-marking centre-back/stopper) was becoming the cornerstone of the team and of the Italian team also. In the 1986–87 season. Inter closely fought Napoli for the Scudetto, finishing third despite a series of injuries which plagued the team in the final weeks of the season (among others, Marco Tardelli, Alessandro Altobelli and Karl-Heinz Rummenigge had to watch the final matches from the bench). However, Zenga imposed himself as the best goalkeeper in Italy, finishing the 30 matches-long season conceding only 17 goals and by being picked by new Italy's manager Azeglio Vicini as the starter in the goalkeeping position.

The next season would prove to be disappointing for Inter and Zenga: the team struggled all the season, due to lack of compatibility between the two main forwards (team's captain Altobelli and the newly acquired Aldo Serena) and between the two offensive midfielders Gianfranco Matteoli and the Belgian Vincenzo Scifo. Plus Zenga, dissatisfied with the way the club was managed, decided to leave Inter and join the then dominant Napoli. However, the move did not materialize and Zenga remained with Inter. The highlight of the season for Zenga was the participation in the 1988 UEFA European Championships with Italy.

However, the next season would prove to be one of the best for Inter and Zenga. The team, reinvigorated by the acquisitions of the young Italians Alessandro Bianchi and Nicola Berti, the Germans Andreas Brehme and Lothar Matthäus from Bayern Munich and the Argentine Ramón Díaz dominated the season, winning the league title with a record haul of 58 points and breaking several other records during the year. Such a performance is even more impressive if the whole quality of the tournament is taken in consideration: in second position there was the Diego Maradona-led Napoli and in third position the star-studded and future European champion Milan. Zenga ended the season conceding only 19 goals, the best goalkeeper again in that respect.

The 1989–90 and 1990–91 seasons proved to be bittersweet for Inter: although the team remained a title contender, it didn't manage to take another success on home soil, except for the victory in the Supercoppa Italiana played in November 1989 against Sampdoria. The 1991 season turned up to be a close fight between Inter and Sampdoria, with the title decided in a match played in Milan, which Inter would lose 0–2 allowing Gianluca Vialli and Roberto Mancini to win the league title. However, Inter won the UEFA Cup that year, defeating, among the others, Aston Villa, Atalanta and Sporting Clube de Portugal on the road to the final against A.S. Roma. Inter won the first match 2–0 and lost only 1–0 in Rome, achieving the first European success since the 1960s. After that match, manager Giovanni Trapattoni left the team, as he decided to return as coach of Juventus.

On a personal scale, Zenga experienced in these seasons the peak of his career. For three consecutive years (1989–1991) he was nominated by IFFHS the best goalkeeper in the world, ahead of goalkeepers like Michel Preud'homme, Rinat Dasaev and Andoni Zubizarreta. Zenga was at his best between the posts, as his great explosiveness and sharp reflexes enabled him to make great and spectacular saves. Not known for being a great penalty saver (frequently dropping down to the ground in the middle of the goal), in his career he did however save penalty kicks from Roberto Baggio, Michel Platini and Paul Merson.

Zenga continued to play for Inter until 1994, winning the UEFA Cup in 1991 and 1994, his last season with the club.

In 1994, Zenga transferred to Sampdoria, and then to Padova two years later. He then moved on to New England Revolution and Major League Soccer. Zenga played in goal for them in the league's second season in 1997, then left to pursue an acting career (he and his girlfriend starred in an Italian soap opera). During a game versus the Tampa Bay Mutiny in 1997, he celebrated a goal by running to the sidelines and making out with his girlfriend, as the Mutiny barely missed the open net straight from the kickoff. Zenga came back to the Revs in 1999, as a player-manager, but only lasted a year in both those positions.

Career statistics

Club

1 Including appearances in 1989 Supercoppa Italiana, 1994 Supercoppa Italiana and MLS Cup Playoffs .

International career
Zenga was capped 58 times for the Italy national football team at senior level between 1987 and 1992. In these, he conceded only 21 goals (0.36 per game) and kept 41 clean sheets (70.69%), both averages being a record for the Italy national team. He previously featured in the Italian squad at the 1984 Olympics, where the team managed a fourth-place finish, and also featured as one of the Italy under-21 side's overage players 1986 UEFA European Under-21 Championship, as the team's starting goalkeeper. He was also included in Enzo Bearzot's 22-man Italy squad for the 1986 World Cup. Initially selected as the team's third goalkeeper behind Fiorentina's Giovanni Galli and Roma's Franco Tancredi, his name was taken in consideration by Bearzot before the match against the Michel Platini-led France due to the poor performances of Galli (who, in the end, also played against France).

Zenga became the Italy national side's starting goalkeeper under manager Azeglio Vicini, ahead of his perceived career rival, Stefano Tacconi. During the 1988 UEFA European Championships, Zenga played all four of Italy's matches (a 1–1 draw against West Germany, a 1–0 victory over Spain, and a 2–0 win over Denmark in the group stage matches, and a 0–2 loss against the Soviet Union in the semi-final). Here again Zenga was at the centre of controversy: in the first match against West Germany he conceded a free kick inside the penalty area due to having made too many steps while carrying the ball in his hands (an infringement rarely penalised). Andreas Brehme, who would become Zenga's teammate at Inter only a few months later, scored from the resulting free kick to tie the game for West Germany. Italy reached the semi-finals of the competition.

Zenga remained first choice goalkeeper when Italy hosted the World Cup in 1990, and helped the team to a third-place finish, during which he set a record of five consecutive clean sheets, and a total of 518 minutes without conceding a goal, a record still standing. His unbeaten streak was ended by Claudio Caniggia's header in the semi-finals against defending champions Argentina, after Zenga had made an error when coming out to collect a cross; following a 1–1 draw after extra-time, Argentina advanced to the final 4–3 on penalties, while Zenga failed to stop a single spot kick in the shoot-out. In the third-place match against England, Zenga conceded his second goal of the tournament when he was beaten by a David Platt header, although Italy managed to capture the bronze medal with a 2–1 victory.

After Italy had failed to qualify for the 1992 European Championship, Arrigo Sacchi was appointed as Italy's new manager, and he eventually excluded Zenga from his side, in favour of goalkeepers who were more suited to his zonal marking defensive system, such as Gianluca Pagliuca, and Luca Marchegiani.

Style of play
An aggressive, consistent, physically strong, complete, and athletic goalkeeper, Zenga was nicknamed Deltaplano ("Hang glider") due to his excellent shot-stopping abilities, positioning, explosive reactions, bravery, and in particular for his speed, elegance, and agility, which enabled him to produce spectacular saves. Despite his reputation, the media was often critical of Zenga's penalty-saving record throughout his career, although he stopped penalties against notable specialists, such as Roberto Baggio, Paul Merson, and Michel Platini; he was also criticised by pundits for his unsteady performances when coming out off his line to claim crosses, and performed best between the posts, while he was also not particularly adept with the ball at his feet, or very confident in his distribution, and initially struggled in teams which employed a zonal marking defensive system and the offside trap, due to his reluctancy to rush out of goal. Nevertheless, he was able to adapt successfully to the changes in regulations following the introduction of the back-pass rule, and maintained a high level of performance as his career progressed, even as goalkeepers were required to play more frequently with their feet. In addition to his goalkeeping ability, Zenga also stood out for his strong mentality and leadership from the back, as well as his temper and flamboyant celebrations as a footballer, and was also known for his composure under pressure, which enabled him not to be fazed if he ever made any errors.

His other nickname, L'Uomo Ragno ("Spider-Man"), is not related to his goalkeeping skills, but rather to a curious circumstance: in 1992, while answering questions about his exclusion from the Italy national team, Zenga softly sang a song by the Italian band 883, called Hanno ucciso l'Uomo Ragno ("Someone killed Spider-Man"), which led pundits and supporters to call him like the Marvel Comics character.

Managerial career

Early career
His first managerial job was as Player-Manager of New England Revolution: after he left the club, Zenga retired from active football, choosing to pursue a coaching career.

After a short stint with Milanese Serie D team Brera Calcio, Zenga moved to Romania in 2002, first managing Naţional București and then FCSB where he won the domestic title and reached the Round of 16 of the 2004–05 UEFA Cup after eliminating UEFA Cup winners Valencia from the competition.

In the summer 2005, after being fired from FCSB before the end of the season, Zenga joined Red Star Belgrade, leading the Serbo-Montenegrin team to a double (national league and national cup).

In the summer 2006, Zenga was appointed as coach of Turkish Süper Lig side Gaziantepspor; however, after a poor start (five wins in 17 league matches), he resigned in January 2007 in order to accept an offer from United Arab Emirates club Al-Ain.

After just five months in charge, Al-Ain sacked Zenga, who was announced in September 2007 as new Dinamo București coach, replacing Mircea Rednic, but he resigned only two months later following a 1–0 loss in a local derby lost to FCSB. He then accepted a job as a football commentator and pundit for Italian public broadcasting service RAI.

Catania
On 1 April 2008, he agreed to replace resigning boss Silvio Baldini as manager of Catania. He made his Serie A debut on 6 April with a 3–0 home win against Napoli, leading them to a dramatic relegation escape during the final minutes of the league, after a 1–1 home draw against Roma.

Confirmed at the helm of Catania for the 2008–09 season, Zenga proved to be fit for the Italian top flight, leading the rossoazzurri to impressive results in the early part of the season, and agreeing a one-year contract extension with the Sicilian club.

Catania's playing style under Zenga was notable for the coach's focus on free kick planning; his assistant manager Gianni Vio is known to work exclusively on this particular side of football tactics during the weekly training sessions. He guided Catania to a mid-table finish and the Serie A points record for the eastern Sicilian side; at the final home game of the season he announced he was parting company with his club by mutual consent.

Palermo
On 5 June 2009, after being linked with the managerial job at Lazio it was revealed that Zenga had agreed a three-year contract with Palermo to replace outgoing manager Davide Ballardini; the move was seen as a massive surprise due to the Rosanero club being rumoured to be interested in several other managers and the bitter rivalry between them and Catania, the only two Sicilian teams playing in the Italian top flight. He debuted with a 4–2 Coppa Italia win over SPAL 1907, and a 2–1 home win against Napoli in the first week of the Serie A season. However, a number of disappointing results followed, ending in an unimpressive 1–1 home tie to Catania that led Palermo chairman Maurizio Zamparini to remove Zenga from his managerial duties on 23 November, after only thirteen league games in charge of the rosanero.

Middle East
On 11 May 2010, he was announced new head coach of Saudi Professional League club Al-Nassr. He was removed from his position on 24 December after a string of poor results led Al-Nassr to be overtaken at the top of the league table.

On 6 January 2011, Zenga was appointed as new head coach of Al Nasr SC in the UAE Pro-League.

Return to Italy
On 4 June 2015, Zenga returned to Italy, and was appointed head coach at Serie A side Sampdoria for the 2015–16 season. However, after he was sacked in November, and replaced by Vincenzo Montella as head coach, he later returned to the Middle East to manage bottom placed club Al-Shaab, however he was unable to turn around the club's fortunes and left the club on 20 February 2016 by mutual consent.

Wolverhampton Wanderers
On 30 July 2016, Zenga was appointed head coach of Football League Championship side Wolverhampton Wanderers for the 2016–17 season. Despite having never managed in England, he cited his vast foreign experience as enough to succeed. On 2 August, he made his first signings, buying Icelandic striker Jón Daði Böðvarsson from Kaiserslautern and bringing in Portuguese midfielder João Teixeira on a season-long loan from Benfica.

In his first game on 6 August, Zenga's team drew 2–2 away to Rotherham United, coming back from a 2–0 deficit with ten players; he described his first game as an "amazing experience". Zenga took Wolves on a six-game unbeaten run in all competitions, and eight points from his first four league games, including a 3–1 win at local rivals Birmingham City. He praised the Wolves players' spirit and credited them  with leading them to the unbeaten start.

Following the end of the summer transfer window, Zenga, having made ten new signings since his appointment, claimed that the Wolves squad was so strong that he could field two different teams if needed. Following a 4–0 loss to Barnsley, Wolves beat promotion favourites Newcastle United, to end their five-game winning run. Zenga claimed his team's subsequent performances showed that the defeat to Barnsley was "an accident". Wolves then went on a five-game winless run, losing four, that would lead to his dismissal.

Despite the insistence of Dave Edwards that Zenga retrained the support of the Wolves players, he was dismissed on 25 October following only 4 wins out of the club's first 14 Championship fixtures and Wolves 18th in the table. On 7 April 2017, Wolves director Jeff Shi said "I liked Walter. He was passionate, a really lovely guy... Later we found out it was not a good match. We had to change very quickly... The only big mistake in my mind was the coach appointment at the beginning of the season."

Return to Italy
On 8 December 2017, Zenga was appointed Crotone manager. The team was relegated to Serie B at the end of the year.

Zenga returned into management on 11 October 2018 as he was named new head coach of Serie B club Venezia in place of Stefano Vecchi. He was sacked on 5 March 2019, after a run of four losses in five games had the club fighting relegation.

On 3 March 2020, Zenga was appointed new head coach of Serie A club Cagliari, signing a contract until 30 June 2021, with Under-19 coach Max Canzi named as his assistant. His debut for the Sardinian club was delayed due to the coronavirus pandemic and subsequent nationwide lockdown. He won three and drew four of his 13 games in charge as the team finished 14th, and was replaced by Eusebio Di Francesco in August.

Style of management
As a manager, Zenga usually uses a four–man back-line with his teams, while he has used several different tactical systems and formations in midfield and attack throughout his career.

Personal life
Zenga has three children from his first two marriages. He has a son, Jacopo (who later became a footballer himself, and is currently playing in Serie D after spending time with Inter and Genoa at youth level), from his marriage to Elvira Carfagna. From his second marriage, to TV personality Roberta Termali, he has two more sons, Nicolò and Andrea. In 2005, he married 23-year-old Romanian woman Raluca Rebedea. On 19 November 2009, she gave birth to their daughter Samira Valentina.

In April 2010, Zenga said he wanted to take Romanian citizenship. He obtained the status in April 2012.

Managerial statistics

Honours

Player
Inter Milan
 Serie A: 1988–89
 Italian Super Cup: 1989
 UEFA Cup: 1991, 1994

Individual
 MLS Player of the Month: 1997
 Guerin d'Oro: 1987
 IFFHS World's Best Goalkeeper: 1989, 1990, 1991
 UEFA Goalkeeper of the Year: 1990
Pirata d'Oro (Internazionale Player of the Year): 1987
 Inter Milan Hall of Fame: 2018

Manager

FCSB
Romanian First League (1): 2004–05

Red Star Belgrade
 SuperLiga: 2005–06
 Serbian Cup: 2005–06

Orders
 5th Class / Knight: Cavaliere Ordine al Merito della Repubblica Italiana: 1991

Notes

References

External links

1960 births
Living people
Footballers from Milan
Italian footballers
Italy international footballers
Italy under-21 international footballers
Italian football managers
Italian expatriate footballers
1986 FIFA World Cup players
1990 FIFA World Cup players
Catania S.S.D. managers
Palermo F.C. managers
Calcio Padova players
Inter Milan players
Association football goalkeepers
Footballers at the 1984 Summer Olympics
Naturalised citizens of Romania
New England Revolution players
New England Revolution coaches
Olympic footballers of Italy
U.S. Salernitana 1919 players
Serie A players
Serie B players
Serie C players
Major League Soccer players
A.S. Sambenedettese players
FC Progresul București managers
FC Steaua București managers
Red Star Belgrade managers
FC Dinamo București managers
U.C. Sampdoria players
Savona F.B.C. players
UEFA Euro 1988 players
Serie A managers
Al Ain FC managers
Italian expatriate sportspeople in the United States
Italian expatriate sportspeople in Romania
Italian expatriate football managers
Expatriate football managers in England
Expatriate football managers in Romania
Expatriate football managers in Serbia
Expatriate football managers in Saudi Arabia
Expatriate football managers in Turkey
Expatriate football managers in the United Arab Emirates
Expatriate soccer managers in the United States
Major League Soccer All-Stars
Al Nassr FC managers
Al-Nasr SC (Dubai) managers
Al Jazira Club managers
UAE Pro League managers
U.C. Sampdoria managers
Al-Shaab CSC managers
Wolverhampton Wanderers F.C. managers
F.C. Crotone managers
Venezia F.C. managers
Cagliari Calcio managers
UEFA Cup winning players
Romanian people of Italian descent
Romanian football managers
Knights of the Order of Merit of the Italian Republic